The 2013 World TeamTennis season is the 38th season of the top professional tennis league in the United States.

Competition format

The 2013 World TeamTennis season includes 8 teams, split into two conferences (Eastern and Western). The Eastern Conference and Western Conference has 4 teams each. Each team plays a 14 match regular season schedule, with 7 home and 7 away matches.

The top two teams from both the Western and Eastern Conference advance to the 2013 Mylan WTT Conference Championships which will be hosted on Thursday, July 25 by the top‐seeded team in each Conference. The 2013 Mylan WTT Finals will be contested on the home court of the Eastern Conference Champions.

Standings

Results table

Playoffs

References

External links
 Official WTT website
 2013 WTT Media Guide

World Team season
World TeamTennis season
World TeamTennis seasons